Striptease is a 1996 American black comedy film written, co-produced, and directed by Andrew Bergman,  and starring Demi Moore, Armand Assante, Ving Rhames, Robert Patrick and Burt Reynolds. Based on Carl Hiaasen's novel of the same name, the film centers on an FBI secretary-turned-stripper who becomes involved in both a child-custody dispute and corrupt politics.

Moore was paid a then-unprecedented $12.5 million to star in Striptease, making her the highest-paid film actress up to that time. The film was released theatrically on June 28, 1996, by Columbia Pictures and grossed $113 million worldwide against its $50 million budget. However, it was panned by critics, and has come to be evaluated as one of the worst movies ever made. It won six Golden Raspberry Awards, including Worst Picture. The debacle of the film marked a downturn in Moore's career.

Plot

Former FBI secretary Erin Grant loses custody of her young daughter Angela to her ex-husband Darrell, a criminal who cost Erin her job. To afford an appeal to get her daughter back, Erin becomes a stripper at the Eager Beaver, a strip club in Miami.

A Congressman named David Dilbeck visits the club and becomes infatuated with Erin. Aware of Dilbeck's embarrassing indulgences, another Eager Beaver patron approaches Erin with a plan to manipulate the congressman to settle the custody battle and help her get Angela back. However, Dilbeck has powerful business connections who want to ensure he remains in office. Consequently, those who can embarrass him in an election are murdered. Meanwhile, Erin retrieves her daughter from Darrell's negligent care.

Dilbeck's personal interest in Erin persists, and she is invited to perform privately for him. He asks her to become his lover and later his wife, despite his staff's concerns that she knows too much. A debate occurs as to whether to kill Erin or simply keep her quiet by threatening to take away her daughter. However, Erin and a police officer, Al Garcia, begin to suspect the congressman's guilt in the murders, and Erin concocts a plan to bring the congressman to justice. She tricks him into confessing on tape, and he is soon after arrested. Thus, Erin regains full custody of Angela, quits stripping, and gets back her job in the FBI. Darrell returns to prison after he is convicted of his crimes.

Cast

Production
Castle Rock Entertainment produced Striptease. The film is based on the novel Strip Tease by Floridian crime writer Carl Hiaasen. It was published in 1993 and was a bestseller.

The screenplay itself was written by Andrew Bergman, who also directed. According to one critic, the novel's plot is "quite faithfully followed" by the screenplay, but in bringing the complicated story to the screen, "Bergman forgets to explain persuasively what a nice girl like Erin – smart, spunky and a former FBI employee – is doing in a dump called the Eager Beaver."

Bergman says, "I loved the book, and the funny thing was, [author Carl] Hiaasen loved the movie. He thought it was really, really true to the book, which I wanted to do! I don't regret it. I was treated like a freakin’ child molester for making that movie, but so be it."

"Striptease was hard because the tone was so crazy," said Bergman. "How do you stay true to the tone? You have to be true to those strip clubs. There's always some woman with like 50 triple-Ds, they always advertise, and you have to have someone like that. To actually see it, you’re walking this fine line. I didn't want to sanitize it, and I didn't, and I got my ass kicked for it."

Casting

Moore played the main female character, Erin Grant. For the film, she was paid $12.5 million, which was at the time a record for an actress.

Bergman later said, "Is Demi the funniest person in the world? No. Would the movie have been made without her? Probably not. No other major star was willing to take her clothes off, and I was not going to do a TNT version of Striptease with people running around in swimsuits."

To prepare for her role, Moore visited strip clubs in New York City, California and Florida, and she met with strippers.  She also read the novel, exercised, and practiced yoga. Moore was cast before other important parts were cast, creating some interest in the project. In the first attempt at filming Moore stripping, two hundred extras were used to portray the audience. Although their salaries were small, many accepted the role to see Moore nude. After waiting for a while, when Moore finally appeared and started dancing the crowd turned so loud and wild that the shooting had to temporarily cease. As Moore said, "After my experience, I felt very confident."

Rhames plays a bouncer named Shad. The filmmakers, in trying actors out for Shad's part, looked for someone "at least 6'2 and physically massive...any ethnicity." Reynolds played Congressman Dilbeck, and he based his performance on politicians he knew in his early life, through his father, a police chief.

Reynolds was not an actor that the filmmakers originally had in mind for the part (they wanted Gene Hackman), but Reynolds pursued it. When Hackman turned the role down, Reynolds contacted Castle Rock head Rob Reiner, and traveled to Miami to audition. "To be honest," said producer Lobell, "we were not enthusiastic at first. There was the hair and his reputation, but we were curious... At the first audition, on the first day, Burt had to take off his toupee in front of six or seven people. It was tough for him, but he did it. It was a very, very humbling thing to do. But by the end of the audition, it was really clear that Burt was the guy." "I knew I could play him," said Reynolds. "I could make him likable and dangerous. There are very few people who can do that. I always played likable and dangerous. I had a persona. Unfortunately, my persona became bigger than my acting." Reynolds accepted a salary of $350,000; lower than what he had been paid earlier in his career.

Moore's own daughter Rumer Willis, who was 7 years old when the film was released, played Erin's daughter Angela. As Moore explained, "she [Willis] wanted it so badly" that Moore asked that Willis be considered for the part. In reality, this required Willis to see Moore dancing topless, for a scene in which Angela sees Erin performing. However, Moore said that this was acceptable, as "[W]e don't shame the body, we encourage the body as something beautiful and natural, and my children bathe with me, and I walk around naked."

The cast included some notable real-world strippers such as Pandora Peaks. "Talk about a happy set", said Bergman. "We were shooting in Miami for six months. It was a gas".

Reshot ending
During test screenings, audiences objected to a scene at the end where Dilbeck becomes violent and attempts to rape Grant, holding a knife to her throat. The scene was reshot five months later to make it funnier, causing a one-month delay in the release, but test screenings also turned up less than favorable reactions.

Soundtrack

Striptease: Music from the Motion Picture Soundtrack was released on June 25, 1996. While the soundtrack did not include every song heard in the film, a notable exclusion were most tracks Erin (Demi Moore's character) danced to in the film, which, aside from "If I Was Your Girlfriend" by Prince, were all sung by Annie Lennox (whether as part of the Eurythmics or solo). While "Sweet Dreams (Are Made of This)" was featured on the disc, "Money Can't Buy It", "Cold" and "Little Bird" were left off, as was "Missionary Man", which was played during the end credits. Furthermore, it excluded the song "(Pussy, Pussy, Pussy) Whose Kitty Cat Are You?" by the Light Crust Doughboys which won the Golden Raspberry Award for Worst Original Song.

Release
Striptease premiered on June 23 in New York City and was released in the United States on June 28, 1996. It opened in Australia, France and Germany in August, and Argentina, Italy, Bolivia, South Africa, the United Kingdom, Brazil and Japan in September.

Nudity was heavily emphasized in advertisements. The Motion Picture Association of America raised concerns regarding a poster that it felt revealed too much of Moore's naked body. A Castle Rock employee disagreed, saying "there are racier perfume ads."

The previous year's film about nude dancers, Showgirls, was generally disliked, so filmmakers feared audiences would pre-judge Striptease on this basis. To avoid any association, advertisements were designed to make Striptease look more comedic than Showgirls, which was a drama. Besides the subject matter, Striptease and Showgirls did have two notable connections. The choreography in these films was by the same person, Marguerite Derricks. Both also featured performances by Rena Riffel, who plays a dancer in each. To promote the film, Moore appeared on the Late Show with David Letterman and a Barbara Walters special. In both cases, she danced or otherwise exhibited her body.

Reception

Critical response
Striptease holds a 14% rating on Rotten Tomatoes based on 72 reviews, with an average score of 3.9/10. The critical consensus reads, "Striptease can't decide whether it is a lurid thriller or a sexy satire - which becomes a moot point as it proves disastrously incapable of pulling either off." In the Carl Hiaasen book of the same name, upon which the movie was based, every character was premised upon being a source of amusement. In the movie, however, there was a major departure, as the main character, played by Moore, was meant to be portrayed differently. Roger Ebert of the Chicago Sun-Times complimented some of the characters, but ultimately concluded the film failed because "all of the characters are hilarious except for Demi Moore's." He felt the drama surrounding the main character "throws a wet blanket over the rest of the party." Ebert also found the nudity not too sexy. Leonard Maltin was harsher, writing in his book that the film was too depressing, and "Not funny enough, or dramatic enough, or sexy enough, or bad enough, to qualify as entertainment in any category." Barbara Cramer concurred with Ebert that Moore's character was written too dramatically, compared to other characters. She said the film was predictable and would appeal mostly to "post-pubescent schoolboys or closet voyeurs." However, Cramer also cited Reynolds' "best role in years," and said Rhames was "worth the price of admission."

Brian D. Johnson of Maclean's, who thought Moore's acting was terrible, predicted that despite Moore's financial success, her career depended on the success of this film and the film was "tacky, pretentious-and boring." This critic described Striptease as displaying Moore's vanity. Dave Ansen of Newsweek, sharing Ebert's view on Moore's character, also claimed Striptease failed as a drama because it had no mystery, revealing the identity of its villains early. Moreover, the "damsel-in-distress angle generates zero tension." Daniel P. Franklin, in his book Politics and Film: The Political Culture of Film in the United States went so far as to call Striptease "the worst film ever made" and stated "The film pays homage to Moore's surgical breast enhancement". Nathan Rabin, reviewing the film for his series "My Year of Flops", described the film thus: "Moore's dour lead performance sabotages the film from the get-go. It's as if director Andrew Bergman told Moore she was acting in a serious drama about a struggling single mother...and then told everyone else in the cast that they were making a zany crime comedy filled with kooky characters, sleazy hustlers, dumbass opportunists, and outsized caricatures."

Audiences surveyed by CinemaScore gave the film a grade of "B−" on scale of A+ to F.

Box office
Striptease made $12,322,069 in its first weekend, behind The Nutty Professor with Eddie Murphy, Eraser starring Arnold Schwarzenegger, and Disney's The Hunchback of Notre Dame, in which Moore voiced one of the main characters. Ultimately, Striptease made $33,109,743 in the United States, and domestically it was the 47th highest-grossing film of 1996. It made $113,309,743 internationally, having grossed £2,294,568 in the UK and ¥102,419,500 in Japan.

"That movie did better than almost anything I've been involved with," said Bergman. "All the subsidiary stuff was gigantic. People said, 'I wouldn't be caught dead seeing it,'’ and suddenly when it's available in a rental store, it's 'I'll get Schindler's List and Striptease. [laughs] It's like when you're a kid and you're buying condoms at a drug store, but you buy 12 tubes of toothpaste, too."

Accolades

Home media
Striptease was released on VHS on November 19. 1996 and on DVD on July 27, 1999.

Controversies
In 1997, Striptease made news again when it was shown in a fourth-grade class in Chicago, Illinois. The teacher claimed the students chose the film but drew criticism since the film was risqué. The violent 1996 film Scream was shown in the same school on the same day, causing further controversy. In 2000 in Ireland, some viewers criticized the Raidió Teilifís Éireann for running Striptease. These viewers questioned the film's appropriateness and some considered it demeaning to women. The station felt it was not pornography and it was aired at night.

In 2003, Radioactive Films used a scene from Striptease featuring Moore nude in a video called Hollywood's Hottest. This raised a dispute as to whether the use of the scene qualified as fair use. A lawsuit was launched as a consequence.

See also
 List of films considered the worst

References

External links

 
 
 

 

1996 films
1990s black comedy films
1990s crime comedy films
1990s satirical films
1990s sex comedy films
American black comedy films
American crime comedy films
American satirical films
American sex comedy films
Castle Rock Entertainment films
Columbia Pictures films
1990s English-language films
Films about entertainers
Films based on American novels
Films directed by Andrew Bergman
Films scored by Howard Shore
Films set in Miami
Films shot in Miami
Films about striptease
Golden Raspberry Award winning films
Nudity in film
1996 comedy films
Films with screenplays by Andrew Bergman
1990s American films